Jacobus van der Vinden (1 October 1906 – 11 February 1972) was a Dutch gymnast. He competed in seven events at the 1928 Summer Olympics.

References

External links
 

1906 births
1972 deaths
Dutch male artistic gymnasts
Olympic gymnasts of the Netherlands
Gymnasts at the 1928 Summer Olympics
Gymnasts from Amsterdam